"You Are Loved (Don't Give Up)" is the second track and the first single from Josh Groban's third album, Awake, released on November 7, 2006. The song's music and lyrics were written by Tawgs Salter. The single peaked at #9 on the Hot Adult Contemporary Tracks chart.

Cultural references
In The Simpsons episode "Lisa the Drama Queen", from the twentieth season of the show, Lisa and Juliet sing "You Are Loved (Don't Give Up)" while on the playground at their school.

Charts

Weekly charts

Year-end charts

References

2006 singles
Josh Groban songs
Music videos directed by Meiert Avis
Song recordings produced by David Foster
Songs written by Tawgs Salter
2006 songs
Reprise Records singles
143 Records singles